Eric Gordon Thompson (9 July 1927 – 15 May 1996) was a British Olympic cyclist.

Cycling career
He represented England and won a gold medal in the road race at the 1954 British Empire and Commonwealth Games in Vancouver, Canada.

Personal life
He died after cycling across Spain with friends in May 1996. He had been president of the Derby Mercury cycling club and took part in the first running of the Dovedale Dash.

Achievements

References

External links
 
Derby Mercury history with section on Eric Thompson

1927 births
1996 deaths
English male cyclists
Cyclists at the 1954 British Empire and Commonwealth Games
Cyclists at the 1956 Summer Olympics
Cyclists at the 1960 Summer Olympics
Olympic cyclists of Great Britain
Commonwealth Games gold medallists for England
Sportspeople from Derby
Commonwealth Games medallists in cycling
Medallists at the 1954 British Empire and Commonwealth Games